The "Anima Christi" (Latin for ‘Soul of Christ’) is a Catholic prayer to Jesus of medieval origin.

History
For many years the prayer was popularly believed to have been composed by Saint Ignatius of Loyola, as he puts it at the beginning of his Spiritual Exercises and often refers to it. In the first edition of the Spiritual Exercises Ignatius merely mentions it, evidently supposing that the reader would know it. In later editions, it was printed in full. It was by assuming that everything in the book was written by Ignatius that it came to be looked upon as his composition. On this account the prayer is sometimes referred to as the Aspirations of St. Ignatius Loyola.

However, the prayer actually dates to the early fourteenth century and was possibly written by Pope John XXII, but its authorship remains uncertain.  It has been found in a number of prayer books printed during the youth of Ignatius and is in manuscripts which were written a hundred years before his birth. The English hymnologist James Mearns found it in a manuscript of the British Museum which dates back to about 1370. In the library of Avignon there is preserved a prayer book of Cardinal Pierre de Luxembourg (died 1387), which contains the prayer in practically the same form as we have it today. It has also been found inscribed on one of the gates of the Alcázar of Seville, which dates back to the time of Pedro the Cruel (1350–1369).

The invocations in the prayer have rich associations with Catholic concepts that relate to the Eucharist (Body and Blood of Christ), Baptism (water) and the Passion of Jesus (Holy Wounds).

Text

In the mid-nineteenth century the prayer was translated and published as the English hymn Soul of my Saviour, sanctify my breast by Edward Caswall. Since then it has been popular as a communion hymn in Anglican and Catholic communities and has been included in some 43 different hymnals.

Musical adaptations

Jean-Baptiste Lully composed a motet called Anima Christi, and musicians such as Giovanni Valentini have performed it. Liszt made two settings of it, both for male voices and organ, in 1874.[published in the Breitkopf Franz-Liszt-Stiftung, volume V/6 (1936)]

Notes

Catholic devotions
Roman Catholic prayers
Spiritual warfare
Pope John XXII